Senator Hightower may refer to:

Bill Hightower (born 1959), Alabama State Senate
Jack Hightower (1926–2013), Texas State Senate